Claude Noël (born October 31, 1955) is a Canadian professional scout with the New Jersey Devils, former NHL player and head coach. Noël has close to 30 years experience coaching with his most recent coaching position being head coach of the Vancouver Giants of the Western Hockey League in the 2014–2015 season.

Playing career
Noël was undrafted after playing 1974–75 with the Kitchener Rangers, but he was signed as a professional with the Buffalo Norsemen of the North American Hockey League (NAHL), starting a long minor league playing career. The next season, he moved up to the American Hockey League (AHL) with the Hershey Bears. He stayed with the Bears until 1981, earning one call-up to the Washington Capitals in the 1979–80 season of seven games. After Hershey he played with several teams in the International Hockey League: Toledo Goaldiggers, Kalamazoo Wings and Milwaukee Admirals before retiring in 1988.  While with the Buffalo Norsemen, his team ended up involved in what is now considered to be an infamous pre game brawl with the Johnstown Jets. The events of this brawl and subsequent forfeited game would form the basis of a memorable scene between the Charleston Chiefs and the Peterboro Patriots in the cult film Slap Shot.  Claude Noel confirmed that he was on the ice for that event during a press conference on November 16, 2011.

Coaching career
After his professional playing career, Noël moved into coaching.  He began in the East Coast Hockey League, spending one season as head coach of the Roanoke Valley Rebels then two seasons as head coach of the Dayton Bombers.  Noël moved to the International Hockey League's Kalamazoo Wings (later the renamed the Michigan K-Wings), spending two seasons as assistant coach and two seasons as head coach.  From there, Noël moved on to take an assistant coaching job with the Milwaukee Admirals also of the IHL and later the American Hockey League.  After three seasons in Milwaukee, Noël went back to the ECHL for one season as the head coach of the Toledo Storm.

In 2003, Noël returned to the Admirals as head coach.  In his first season, the Admirals won the Calder Cup.  Noël was awarded the Louis A. Pieri Memorial Award as Coach of the Year.  Noël spent three more seasons in Milwaukee, leading the team to winning record each season.

In 2007, Noël was hired by Ken Hitchcock and the Columbus Blue Jackets as an assistant coach. On February 3, 2010, Noël was named interim head coach of the Columbus Blue Jackets, after Ken Hitchcock was relieved of his coaching duties. The team went 10–8–6 under Noël, but his contract was not renewed at the end of the season.

On June 18, 2010, Noël was offered the head coaching position for the Vancouver Canucks AHL affiliate, the Manitoba Moose. Noël was officially introduced to the media as the new head coach of the Manitoba Moose on June 21, 2010. Coincidentally, Columbus hired Scott Arniel, Manitoba's former coach, for the head coach job in Columbus.

The return of the NHL to Winnipeg forced the Moose to relocate in June 2011.  True North Sports and Entertainment, owners of both the new Winnipeg NHL team and the Moose, received permission from the Canucks to interview Noël for their vacant head coaching job.  On June 24, Noël was named the head coach of the Winnipeg Jets. He was fired on January 12, 2014 and replaced by former Carolina Hurricanes and Toronto Maple Leafs head coach Paul Maurice. On November 30, 2014, Noël was announced as the head coach of the WHL Vancouver Giants. He coached the team for the remainder of the season before a mutual parting of ways at the season's conclusion.

On August 4, 2015, Noël was named as a pro scout of the NHL New Jersey Devils.

Personal
Born in Kirkland Lake, Ontario, Noël was raised in McGarry and North Bay. He and his wife Lynda have two sons, Chris and Sheldon.

NHL coaching record

References

External links

1955 births
Buffalo Norsemen players
Canadian ice hockey coaches
Canadian ice hockey forwards
Columbus Blue Jackets coaches
ECHL coaches
Franco-Ontarian people
Hershey Bears players
Ice hockey people from Ontario
Kalamazoo Wings (1974–2000) players
Kitchener Rangers players
Living people
Manitoba Moose coaches
Milwaukee Admirals coaches
New Jersey Devils scouts
North Bay Centennials coaches
Sportspeople from Kirkland Lake
Undrafted National Hockey League players
Washington Capitals players
Winnipeg Jets coaches
Vancouver Giants coaches